The New Brunswick Youth Orchestra, NBYO for short, is a youth orchestra based in Saint John, New Brunswick, Canada. Founded in 1965, the orchestra has approximately 80 members from across the province. The NBYO tours New Brunswick each year, and occasionally performs in other countries, funded by a Board of Directors as well as private, municipal, and provincial grants.

History
The New Brunswick Youth Orchestra was founded in 1965 under Philip W. Oland, who was the president of the New Brunswick Symphony Orchestra (NBSO) at that time. The NBYO effectively became New Brunswick's main orchestra at the NBSO's discontinuation in 1968. The NBYO first performed Woodstock, New Brunswick in October 1966.

The NBYO went on to give many other performances, including musical presentations at Expo 67 and the National Arts Centre. It also participated in several festivals such as the Dominion Centenary Festival of Music for Senior Orchestras, the Festival of International Youth Orchestras, Canadian Festival of Youth Orchestras and the Summa Cum Laude International Youth Music Festival Competition in Vienna, Austria.

In 2009, the New Brunswick Youth Orchestra adopted a musical education and training program entitled Sistema New Brunswick, inspired by the Venezuelan El Sistema program.

Conductors

 Bruce Holder (assistant conductor; 1966)
 Stanley Saunders (1965-1968)
 Kelsey Jones (1968-1969)
 Clayton Hare (1969-1970)
 Stanley Saunders (1970-1974)
 Kenneth Elloway (1974-1975)
 Rodney McLeod (1975-1982)
 James Mark (1982-1983)
 Rodney McLeod (1983-1987)
 Nurhan Arman (1988-1989)
 Peter Pulford (1989-1990)
 Paul Campbell (1990-1994)
 James Mark (1994-2010)
 Antonio Delgado (2010–present)

The NBYO has been guest conducted by, among others, Victor Feldbrill, Alexander Brott, Jánós Sándor, Oskar Danon, Carolyn Davies and Brian Ellard.

Special performances
The NBYO has performed in the following places:
2003 - Carnegie Hall, New York, New York
2004 - St. Croix River, St. Croix, New Brunswick
2005 - Auditorium Niccolò Paganini, Parma, Italy
2007 - Forbidden City, Beijing
2011 - Wiener Musikverein, Vienna

Awards
2008 East Coast Music Award, Classical Recording of the Year (Forbidden City Tour)
2008 – Orchestras Canada Betty Webster Award for outstanding orchestral achievements
2010 - TD Canada Trust Award - Arts Organization of the Year
2011 - East Coast Music Association nomination, DVD of the Year (Blues on the Boulevard)
2011 - Summa Cum Laude International Youth Music Competition (Vienna, Austria) - 1st place in the Symphony Orchestra category
2012 - East Coast Music Association nomination, Classical Recording of the Year (Musikfreunde)

Discography

Studio albums
2003: Première
2005: Virtuoso Italia 2005
2007: Forbidden City Tour
2011: Musikfreunde, NBYO Vienna Festival and Competition

See also 
 List of youth orchestras

References

External links
 NBYO/OJNB Official Wwbsite

Canadian orchestras
Youth orchestras
Musical groups established in 1965
Musical groups from Saint John, New Brunswick
1965 establishments in New Brunswick